Colin Norval Ward (born November 22, 1960) is a former Major League Baseball pitcher. Ward played for the San Francisco Giants in 1985. He batted and threw left-handed.
    
He was drafted by the Detroit Tigers in the 3rd round of the 1982 amateur draft.

References

External links

1960 births
Living people
San Francisco Giants players
Baseball players from California
UCLA Bruins baseball players
Lakeland Tigers players
Birmingham Barons players
Phoenix Giants players
Shreveport Captains players
Phoenix Firebirds players
Las Vegas Stars (baseball) players
San Bernardino Spirit players
Vermont Mariners players